Georgetown University is a private research university located in Washington, D.C. Founded in 1789, Georgetown University is the oldest Catholic and Jesuit institution of higher education in the United States. The school graduates about two thousand undergraduate and postgraduate students annually. There are nine constitutive schools, five of which offer undergraduate degrees and six of which offer graduate degrees, as two schools offer both undergraduate and graduate degrees.

Legend 
Note: Individuals who may belong in multiple sections appear only in one. An empty class year or school/degree box indicates that the information is unknown.
 * Indicates the alumnus or alumna attended but did not graduate (includes years of attendance)
 Col – Georgetown College
CAS – former College of Arts & Sciences
SLL – former School of Languages and Linguistics, now the Faculty of Languages and Linguistics within the College
 Dent – School of Dentistry (defunct)
 Grad – Graduate School of Arts and Sciences
 Law – Law Center (Juris Doctor or Bachelor of Laws)
LL.M. – Master of Laws
 Med – School of Medicine
R – Medical residency in the School of Medicine
W – Fellowship in the School of Medicine
 MSB – McDonough School of Business (undergraduate)
GSB – former Georgetown School of Business
SBA – former School of Business Administration
MBA – Master of Business Administration (graduate)
 NHS – School of Nursing and Health Studies
Nur – former Georgetown University Nursing School
 MPP – McCourt School of Public Policy
GPPI – former Georgetown Public Policy Institute
 SCS – School of Continuing Studies
SCE – former School of Summer and Continuing Education
CED – School of Continuing Education
 SFS – Edmund A. Walsh School of Foreign Service (undergraduate)
MSFS – Master of Science in Foreign Service (graduate)
SSP – Security Studies Program (graduate)

Academia

College and university presidents

Faculty

Business

Civil society

Religion

Think tanks, non-profit and activism

Government and politics

Heads of state and government

Governors of the United States 
This includes the governors of the states and territories of the United States.

United States executive branch officials

Cabinet members 
This includes members of the Cabinet of the United States.

Cabinet-level officers 
This includes persons who are not members of the Cabinet but hold positions that are of cabinet-level rank.

Agency heads and subordinate officers 
This includes the heads of federal independent agencies and officers subordinate to the heads of executive departments.

White House staff 
This includes members of the Executive Office of the President.

Ambassadors of the United States 
This includes ambassadors of the United States to foreign states, international organizations, and at-large causes.

Military

Judges

United States Congress 
The bicameral United States Congress is composed of two houses.

U.S. Senators 
This includes members of the United States Senate.

U.S. Representatives 
This includes members of the United States House of Representatives.

Other U.S. political figures

Other government officials outside the United States

Entertainment

Film, television, and theater

Literature

Music, art, and comedy

Journalism and media

Law

Royalty

Science and medicine

Sports

Athletes

Commissioners, owners, coaches, and managers

Fictional

See also 

 List of Georgetown University faculty
 List of presidents of Georgetown University
 President and Directors of Georgetown College
 History of Georgetown University
For lists of alumni organized by the university's constituent schools see:
 List of Georgetown University Law Center alumni

References

External links 
 Georgetown University Alumni Association

Georgetown University alumni
 
Georgetown University